Lunella undulata, common name the common warrener or the lightning turban, is a species of sea snail, marine gastropod mollusk in the family Turbinidae.

Description
The size of the shell varies between 33 mm and 75 mm. The solid, umbilicate shell has a depressed-globose shape. It is bright green, longitudinally strigate with white under a brown epidermis. The color pattern is sometimes unicolored green, or with the white strigations broken into tessellations. The obtuse spire is dome-shaped, or low-conic and contains five whorls. The upper ones are sometimes angulate, spirally lirate with the lirae wider than their interstices, on the body whorl often subobsolete. The last whorl descends, and is somewhat concave below the suture. The oval aperture is white within. The columella has a very wide white flattened callus which extends over the umbilical tract. The umbilicus is wide and deep.

Distribution
This marine species is endemic to Australia and occurs off New South Wales, South Australia, Tasmania, Victoria and Western Australia.

Ecology 
The species is a dominant feature of shell middens in southeast Australia, archaeological sites created by humans consuming the animal.

References

 Lightfoot, J. 1786. A catalogue of the Portland Museum, lately the property of the Duchess Dowager of Portland: deceased which will be sold by auction, by Mr. Skinner and Co., etc. London viii, 194 pp. + 44 pp.
 Gmelin J.F. 1791. Caroli a Linné. Systema Naturae per regna tria naturae, secundum classes, ordines, genera, species, cum characteribus, differentiis, synonymis, locis. Lipsiae : Georg. Emanuel. Beer Vermes. Vol. 1(Part 6) pp. 3021–3910.
 Tenison-Woods, J.E. 1877. On some new Tasmanian marine shells. Papers and Proceedings of the Royal Society of Tasmania 1876: 131–159
 Cotton, B.C. 1959. South Australian Mollusca. Archaeogastropoda. Handbook of the Flora and Fauna of South Australia. Adelaide : South Australian Government Printer 449 pp.
 Iredale, T. & McMichael, D.F. 1962. A reference list of the marine Mollusca of New South Wales. Memoirs of the Australian Museum 11: 1–109 
 Macpherson, J.H. 1966. Port Philip Survey 1957–1963. Memoirs of the National Museum of Victoria, Melbourne 27: 201–288
 Wilson, B. 1993. Australian Marine Shells. Prosobranch Gastropods. Kallaroo, Western Australia : Odyssey Publishing Vol. 1 408 pp.
 Wilson, B. 2002. A Handbook to Australian Seashells on Seashores East to West and North to South. Sydney : Reed New Holland 185 pp
 : Alf A. & Kreipl K. (2003). A Conchological Iconography: The Family Turbinidae, Subfamily Turbininae, Genus Turbo. Conchbooks, Hackenheim Germany.

External links

 

undulata
Gastropods of Australia
Gastropods described in 1786